Capitán Prat Province is one of four provinces in the southern Chilean region of Aysén (XI). Its capital is Cochrane. The province is named after the naval hero Arturo Prat.

Geography and demography
It is Chile's eighth largest and fourth least populated province as well as the most sparsely populated province in continental Chile. At that time, 2,217 (57.8%) lived in urban areas and 1,620 (42.2%) in rural areas. Between the 1992 and 2002 censuses, the population grew by 1.5% (56 persons).

Administration
As a province, Capitán Prat is a second-level administrative division, governed by a provincial governor appointed by the president. The province comprises three communes, each governed by a municipality, headed by an alcalde: Cochrane, O'Higgins and Tortel.

See also 
 Carretera Austral

References

Provinces of Chile
Provinces of Aysén Region